This is a list of snack foods by country, specific to or originating in a particular community or region. Snack food is a portion of food often smaller than a regular meal, generally eaten as snacking between meals. Snacks come in a variety of forms including packaged and processed foods and items made from fresh ingredients at home.

Asia

Indonesia

Japan

Malaysia and Singapore

Maldives

Taiwan

South America

Peru

Brazil

Europe

Norway

Sweden

Finland

See also 

 List of brand name snack foods
 List of Indian snacks
 List of Indonesian snacks
 List of Japanese snacks
 List of snack foods

References

+Snack